{{Infobox military conflict
|conflict= 2012 Hama offensive
|partof= the Syrian Civil War
|image=2012 Hama Offensive.svg
|image_size  = 300px
|caption= Frontlines during and following the offensive|date= 16–31 December 2012()
|place=Hama Governorate, Syria
|result= Offensive stopped
 FSA fighters take control of 10 towns and villages in northern Hama
 Halfaya massacre
 Syrian Army counterattack recaptures several towns and villages 
|combatant1= Syrian National Coalition
 Free Syrian Army
|combatant2= Syrian Government
  Syrian Armed Forces
|commander1=  Yusuf Hasan
|commander2=Unknown
|units1=Unknown
|units2= Unknown
|strength1=~1,000 fighters
|strength2=2,000 soldiers
|casualties1= 132 killed
|casualties2= 111 killed
|casualties3= 90–200 civilians killed
}}

The 2012 Hama offensive''' was a military operation during the Syrian Civil War launched by the Syrian opposition on 16 December 2012, with the intent of taking control of the Hama Province. The offensive was stopped after the Syrian Army launched a counter-offensive, leaving the rebels in control of only half a dozen towns and villages in the north of the province.

Background
With the Hama province largely controlled by Army Forces, the FSA launched an offensive on 16 December, to capture the province and Hama city itself and by the same time, cutting the principal supply route of the Army in Aleppo.

The offensive
The rebel military council of Hama announced the start of the offensive on 16 December, giving Syrian government troops in the province an ultimatum to surrender to the Free Syrian Army within 48 hours. Within two days, the Syrian Observatory for Human Rights and Qassem Saadeddine, a member of the Free Syrian Army military command, claimed that Syrian government troops had already been cleared from the towns of Halfaya, Kafr Nabudah, Hayalin, Hasraya, al-Lataminah, Taybat al-Imam and Kafr Zita, leaving the rebels in control of the rural western part of Hama Province, and all areas north of Hama city. It seemed that rebels had overrun Syrian Army lines north of Hama city within 48 hours. Government positions in Khan Shaykhun and Mhardeh were reportedly under attack by rebel forces.

The rebels also made claims of fighting inside Hama city itself, with international analysts wondering if the Syrian Army was redeployed towards Homs and Latakia. However, this was not confirmed.

On 19 December, according to the Local Coordination Committees (LCC), Syrian Government security forces reportedly set up checkpoints outside Hayalin, leading to doubts as to whether or not rebels had full control over the town, unlike the other places they captured in the operation.

On 20 December, rebels attacked and captured parts of the town of Morek in Hama's countryside, and were surrounding the Alawite towns of Ma'an and al-Tleisa.

On 23 December, the LCC and SOHR reported that up to 300 civilians were killed by bombing from warplanes in the city of Halfaya, while queuing for bread at a bakery. The Syrian Government did agree that many women and children were killed, however they blamed rebel fighters who they say attacked the town.

On 26 December, the Syrian Army retook control of three Alawite villages, including Ma'an, repelling the rebels who had entered them days earlier.

On 29 December, six people were killed by the Syrian air force bombardment on the town of Kafr Nabudah, two of them were children and two women. Also, one civilian was killed by the bombardment on the town of Taybat al-Imam. A week later, Assad forces from Qamhana, attacked this same town.

On 30 December, the Syrian Army general command announced that they took back control of the strategic town of Morek.

On 31 December, Syrian Army shelling was reported on Halfaya.

Aftermath
On 21 January 2013, SOHR said that a car bomb near the headquarters of a pro-government militia killed 50 people in the eastern suburbs of Hama.

On 22 January, the military launched an offensive, with the aim of recapturing territory lost during the rebel advance into northern Hama. 1,500 soldiers and 100 tanks were being used in the operation, and the focus was on the town of Kernaz in Mhardeh District, where up to 1,000 rebel fighters were based. By early February, the rebels were reportedly in fear of losing Kernaz and with it Kafr Naboudeh. This would leave the military in control of the whole north of Hama, reversing all previous rebel gains.

On 6 February, 54 government employees of a defense-related factory were killed in al-Buraq south of Hama city, when a mini-bus blew up at a bus stop.

On 7 February, the military recaptured Kernaz, after 16 days of fighting. Two days before, the Army had also regained control of the nearby town of Mughir, securing a corridor to Alawite villages in the west of the province.

References

Hama offensive
Hama offensive
Hama Governorate in the Syrian civil war
Military operations of the Syrian civil war involving the Syrian government
Military operations of the Syrian civil war involving the Free Syrian Army
December 2012 events in Syria